Colin David Thomas McKee (8 August 1949 – 6 July 2021) was a South Australian politician who represented the South Australian House of Assembly seat of Gilles from 1989 to 1993 for the Labor Party.

References

 

1949 births
2021 deaths
Members of the South Australian House of Assembly
Australian Labor Party members of the Parliament of South Australia
Politicians from Adelaide